The Selangor woolly horseshoe bat or luctus-like horseshoe bat (Rhinolophus luctoides) is a bat species of the family Rhinolophidae endemic to Malaysia. Populations of this species were previously classified within the woolly horseshoe bat (R. luctus).

References

External links
Sound recordings of Rhinolophus luctoides on BioAcoustica

Rhinolophidae
Mammals described in 2015
Bats of Malaysia